Mandana Rebecca Dayani (born May 1, 1982) is an Iranian-born American activist, attorney, entrepreneur, and angel investor. She co-founded I am a voter, a nonpartisan civic engagement organization that encourages people to participate in civic activities such as voting. Dayani has held various leadership roles in the fashion and media industry. She played a crucial role in establishing The Rachel Zoe Collection, The Zoe Report, and Curateur at Rachel Zoe, Inc. Additionally, she produced a few seasons of Bravo's The Rachel Zoe Project. Dayani served as the Chief Brand Officer for Everything But The House, a global digital estate sale platform. She also worked as an Executive Producer for the company's TV show project for HGTV. Dayani also founded The Learning Series, an event series for women leaders, and serves as an advocate for many social issues. Dayani was the president of Archewell, the media and philanthropic company founded by Prince Harry and Meghan, the Duke and Duchess of Sussex, until 2022.

Early life and education

Dayani was born in Tehran. She fled Iran with her family to Ladispoli, Italy, before being granted asylum as religious refugees to the United States through the help of HIAS. She first settled in New York City before moving to Los Angeles, California. Dayani attended the University of Southern California, where she received her BA and went on to earn a Juris Doctor from the USC Gould School of Law, where she was awarded the USC Summer Fellowship.

Career

Early career 

Dayani started her career as an attorney at Paul Hastings LLP, specializing in the hotel and hospitality industry. 

She later transitioned to commercial talent representation, where she met fashion stylist Rachel Zoe, becoming her client. Dayani then joined Rachel Zoe Inc, overseeing the launch of several businesses, including the Rachel Zoe Collection, The Zoe Report, Curateur, and Rachel Zoe Ventures, as well as managing licensing, publishing, endorsements, and television production.

In 2015, Dayani left Rachel Zoe Inc to become the Chief Brand Officer of online marketplace for estate sales, Everything But The House. She played a significant role in securing a multi-million dollar venture capital investment and served as the Executive Producer of their TV project for HGTV.

I am a voter. 

In 2018, Dayani co-founded I am a voter., a nonpartisan movement aimed at promoting civic engagement and increasing voter turnout. The organization has partnered with many well-known brands. Their campaign to boost voter registration has included various celebrities. Their campaign generated over 1 billion digital impressions and 250 media articles upon launch.

The Dissenters 

In 2020, Dayani, together with Debra Messing, launched The Dissenters Podcast with Dear Media. The podcast features interviews with advocates for social issues, including Glennon Doyle, Sophia Bush, Hillary Clinton, Jane Fonda, Congressman Adam Schiff, Amanda Nguyen, Lena Waithe, Preet Bharara, Jameela Jamil, Christian Siriano, Shannon Watts, Eva Longoria, and Patrisse Cullors.

References

External links
 Official website

Living people
1982 births
USC Gould School of Law alumni
Lawyers from Los Angeles
American women lawyers
21st-century American women